The 1968 Sulawesi earthquake struck Indonesia on August 14. It had a Richter magnitude of 7.4, spawned a large tsunami, and killed roughly 200 people.

Damage and casualties 
The earthquake had a Richter magnitude of 7.4.

Geology 
The earthquake ruptured along Palu-Koro fault in Manimbaja Bay. It also appeared to uplift at least one of the Togian Islands.

The earthquake was near the Celebes Sea; it sank the island of Tuguan.

See also 
2018 Sulawesi earthquake and tsunami
List of earthquakes in 1968
List of earthquakes in Indonesia

References

External links 

1968 tsunamis
1968 earthquakes
1968 in Indonesia 
1968 disasters in Indonesia 
Earthquakes in Indonesia
Tsunamis in Indonesia
August 1968 events in Asia
History of Sulawesi